Youth of May is a 2021 South Korean television series starring Lee Do-hyun, Go Min-si, Lee Sang-yi, and Keum Sae-rok. It premiered on KBS2 on May 3, 2021, and aired on every Monday and Tuesday at 21:30 (KST) until June 8, 2021, for 12 episodes. It is an original drama of OTT media service Wavve and is available for streaming on its platform.

Synopsis
Youth of May is set in the year 1980 during the Gwangju Uprising, follows the love story of medical student Hwang Hee-Tae (Lee Do-hyun) and nurse Kim Myung-Hee (Go Min-si). Rather than focusing on the frontline of the Gwangju Uprising, the drama is about the love and friendships of young people who would’ve had ordinary lives otherwise.

Hwang Hee-Tae (Lee Do-hyun) becomes the pride of Gwangju when he enters Seoul National University College of Medicine with top marks. His best friend Kyung-Soo, an avid pro-democracy activist, insists they open an illegal clinic for students on the run from the government. One day, a factory worker is injured during a protest. In exchange for the costs of discreetly transporting himself and the factory worker to his hometown, Hee-Tae must go to a meeting with a potential marriage partner arranged by his father. At this meeting, Hee-Tae meets Myung-Hee (Go Min-si), a nurse persevering through the hardships of life. She only agrees to go to this meeting in place of her friend Soo-Ryeon (Keum Sae-rok), because she needs to come up with the airfare to go study in Germany. However, Myung-Hee and Hee-Tae end up falling in love.

In May 1980, amidst the heated passion and cries for democracy that reverberate throughout Gwangju, Hee-Tae and Myung-Hee find themselves in a twist of fate.

Cast

Main
 Lee Do-hyun as Hwang Hee-tae
 Choi Won-young as elder Hwang Hee-tae
 Hwang Gi-nam's son and Song Hae-ryeong's stepson. A Medical student who has a sly and mischievous side, but is determined and goal oriented underneath. Although Hwang Hee-tae entered Seoul University’s medical school with top scores, he postpones his graduation due to a trauma. Hee-tae appears to be carefree and lighthearted, but he’s a figure who is more thoughtful than anyone else on the inside.
 Go Min-si as Kim Myung-hee
 Kim Hyeon-cheol's only daughter. A nurse three years into her career, Kim Myung-hee is a fighter who has already gone through all sorts of hardships in her young life. When facing injustice, she isn’t afraid to stand up to her superiors at the hospital, and no matter what difficulties life throws her way, she determinedly chases her dream. Additionally, despite her relatively young age, Kim Myung-hee is a responsible breadwinner who works hard to scrape a living and sends money to her younger brother back home. After crossing paths with Hee-tae, Myung-hee begins to change in subtle ways and shows new sides of herself.
 Lee Sang-yi as Lee Soo-chan
 Brother of Soo-ryeon and Lee Chang-geun's son, he is a businessman who works at a trading company after returning from his studies in France. With a three-years age gap, he is the oldest child, who places more importance on family than on himself. Lee Soo-chan relates with Myung-hee because she similarly faces hardships as the head of a household.
 Keum Sae-rok as Lee Soo-ryeon
 Soo-chan's sister and Lee Chang-geun's daughter. A law student who desperately fights for social justice, because she feels responsibility for coming from a wealthy family. Lee Soo-ryeon is longtime friends with Kim Myung-hee. While trying to help her friend with her dream, she finds herself starting an unexpected relationship with someone that leaves her conflicted.

Supporting

Hwang Hee-tae's family
 Oh Man-seok as Hwang Gi-nam
 Hwang Hee-tae's power-obsessed father and Song Hae-ryeong's husband.
 Shim Yi-young as Song Hae-ryeong
 Hwang Gi-nam's second wife and Hee-tae's stepmother. The only daughter of a famous brewing company.
 Choi Seung-hoon as Hwang Jang-tae
 Hee-tae's half-brother and Myung-soo's friend.

Kim Myung-hee's family 
 Kim Won-hae as Kim Hyeon-cheol
 Kim Myung-hee's father and Choi Soon-nyeo's husband. A watch repairman with a dodgy leg.
 Hwang Young-hee as Choi Soon-nyeo
 Kim Myung-hee's mother and Kim Hyeon-cheol's wife. A housewife who took care of her sick husband and mother-in-law while raising Myung-hee and Myung-soo.
 Jo Yi-hyun as Kim Myung-soo
 Myung-hee's younger brother. Born a late child and raised in love, an innocent child. South Jeolla Province's national 1,000-meter runner will compete in the boys' event. He is good at running since he was young, and he always ran the relay as a class representative whenever there was a sports day. He's a deep-seated child who's trying to mediate between a father and his sister. He's a 12-year-old boy who can't even tie his shoelaces.
 Park Hye-jin as Myung-hee's grandmother

Lee Soo-chan and Lee Soo-ryeon's family 
 Um Hyo-sup as Lee Chang-geun
 Lee Soo-chan and Lee Soo-ryeon's father. A successful businessman who lost his wife due to a chronic illness and raised the children alone.
 Hong Boo-hyang as Lee Soo-chan and Lee Soo-ryeon's aunt. A housemaid

Pyeonghwa Hospital 
 Park Chul-min as Choi Byeong-gil
 Vice President of PyeongHwa Hospital. On behalf of the president of the Royal Family hospital. He is in charge of various hospital affairs and decisions.
 Kim Bo-jung as Kim Min-ju
 A nurse in the emergency room of PyeongHwa Hospital. Myung-hee's 1-year senior and military base. Due to heavy emergency room work stress, they are constantly demanding staffing.
 Kim Yi-kyung as Oh In-yeong
 A new nurse in the emergency room of Pyeonghwa Hospital. Myunghee's direct junior (precepti) As a chic nurse who just graduated from nursing college, she is still a part of her daily routine.
 Jang Won-hyeok as Yoo Byeong-cheol
 A resident of the emergency room of PyeongHwa Hospital. Subtracted suffers from overwork due to the work his seniors left behind, and he regrets choosing his major every night. Even though his personality is not caring, thanks to his personality that does not cross the line Compared to other doctors, he communicates best with nurses.

Military
 Kwon Young-chan as Kim Kyung-soo
 Private. Hee-tae's college friend and martial law army deployed in Gwangju. He was arrested while attending the Department of Korean Language Education at Seoul National University and was forced to enlist. A discarded animal, a flower blooming on the side of the road, In the military, they are treated as "advisors" He has endured day by day from senior harassment and intense training in Chungcheong.
 Kim Eun-soo as Lee Kwang-gu
 Corporal. The only person who takes care of Kyungsoo, the "advisor," through the opposition of Kyungsoo. When he tried luck and failed the entrance exam, he enlisted in Hyeon-Gim instead of Samsu. Born in Gyeongsang-do’s father and Jeolla-do’s mother, Both dialects are proficient, but because of the senior sergeant who has a seizure in Jeolla-do, He have been serving in Gyeongsang Province for several years, pretending to be from Gyeongsang Province.
 Noh Sang-bo  as Hong Sang-pyo
 Sgt. The tyrant of the quarter grabbing Kyungsoo like a rat. Everyone is praying for a quick campaign through his vicious conduct. The date of dismissal is getting postponed after going to the brig because of the middle-middle-severe harshness.

Boarding House
 Park Se-hyun as Lee Jin-ah
 Boarding house owner's daughter. A cheeful high school student who has a crush on Hee-tae. She likes pop music and dreams of becoming a radio producer in Seoul.
 Heo Jung-do as Lee Kyung-pil
 The boarding house owner. Originally from Jinju, he lived in Gwangju for over 20 years. A Gyeongsang-do man living in Gwangju even after his wife and a native of Gwangju died. With the title of a boarding house owner, he rejoices that he is doing "lease" somewhere, As a housekeeper in charge of virtually all kinds of housework, he specializes in washing stains and cooking soup.

Others
 Jung Wook-Jin  as Choi Jeong-haeng
 A passionate constable. An avid chic cop full of mistakes but full of motivation. When it comes to torch demonstrations or street demonstrations, we take the lead in ‘citizen’s guard’, Before he was a policeman, he was just one citizen, a native of Gwangju. 
 Lee Hwang-eui as Han Suk-joong
 An influential person working as a lawmaker in Jeonnam. The maintenance of the area that was born and raised in the family, which has been one by one since the Japanese colonial period. His survival strategy is to keenly catch the flow of power and find an "appropriate" position. It is a great pride to be an elder of a large church, and his wife is also active as a governor. Hwang Gi Nam, who bends like a tongue in his mouth, serves as a bridge to meet'big hands'.
 Lee Gyu-sung as Jeong Hye-gun
 Hee-tae's only hometown friend and Myung-hee's church friend. He is currently studying Political Science and Diplomacy at Chonnam National University and a member of the movement for democracy.
 Joo Bo-young as Park Seon-min
 Myunghee's friend at the cathedral. She is currently attending the Department of Korean Language and Literature at Chosun University. Taking pictures is her hobby, and she have been learning photography from Hye-Geon's father. Her goal is to get a job as a photojournalist at a newspaper in the future.
 Kim Tae-bum as Park Dong-wook
 Track and field coach.
 Nam Tae-woo as detective
 A detective who obeys Hwang Gi-nam's every order.
 Kim In-seon as Jung Seok-chul 
 Kim Kyungsoo's girlfriend injured in protests

Special appearances
 Kim Hyun as Aunt
 Kwon Eun-bin as Yu-jin
 Hwang Hee-tae's ex-girlfriend (Ep. 1)
 Kwon Hyuk-hyun as In-jae
 Hwang Hee-tae's university senior (Ep. 1)
 Yoo Soon-woong as priest (Ep. 1)
 Bae Sung-il as chief (Ep. 1)
 Oh Kyu-taek as used car dealer (Ep. 1)
 Kwak Ja-hyoung as Sang-Gon (Ep. 1)
 Lee Joong-yul as Mr. Kim (Ep. 1)
 Jung Ji-ahn as bus attendant (Ep. 2)
 Jin Yong-wook as Hyun-Chul (Ep. 2)
 Gu Da-song as Bo-yeon (Ep. 3 & 9)
 Lee Young-jin as doctor (Ep. 3)
 Choi Nam-wook as Taxi driver (Ep. 8)
 Jang Tae-min as ambulance driver (Ep. 8)
 Han Myung-hwan as Kim Sung-wook (Ep. 9)
 Jo Ji-hyun as bus station employee (Ep. 10)
 Park Eun-young as Kim Sung-Wook's mother (Ep. 10)
 Ha Sung-min as Kim Sung-Wook's father (Ep. 12)
 Sung Ki-yoon as Hwang Jung-tae (Older) (Ep. 12)
 Hong Eun-jeong as Hwang Jung-Tae's secretary (Ep. 12)
 Kim Ju-yeon as nurse (Ep. 12)
 Lee Sang-hwa as violent hospital (Ep. 12)
 Jang Do-ha as Lee Seo-on (Ep. 12)
 Jung Hee-tae as Kim kyung-soo (Older) (Ep.1, 11–12)

Production
On October 6, 2020, Lee Do-hyun and Go Min-si's respective agencies announced that they were in talks for the lead roles. They were confirmed to star in the series on December 21, making it their second collaboration after Sweet Home (2020), along with Lee Sang-yi and Keum Sae-rok in the roles of siblings. Since the drama is set in Gwangju, most of dialogues are spoken in its dialect.

Original soundtrack

Part 1

Part 2

Part 3

Part 4

Part 5

Part 6

Part 7

Part 8

Part 9

Part 10

Viewership

Awards and nomination

References

External links
  
 
 
 

Korean Broadcasting System television dramas
2021 South Korean television series debuts
2021 South Korean television series endings
Korean-language television shows
South Korean melodrama television series
Television series set in 1980
Works about the Gwangju Uprising
Television series based on actual events
Television series by Story Hunter Production
Wavve original programming